Ahmed Khan Bahadur (born 9 July 1967) is a Pakistani politician from Mardan who serves as a member of the Khyber Pakhtunkhwa Assembly belong to the Awami National Party (ANP). He also serves as committee member of the Standing Committee No. 28 (Science and Technology and Information Technology Department), the Standing Committee No. 36 (Relief, Rehabilitation and Settlement Department) and the Standing Committee No. 14 (Industries and Technical Education Department). He also served as a member of the Khyber Pakhtunkhwa Assembly in 2008 Pakistani general election, again in 2013, and for a third time in 2018.

He earned his BA degree from the Government Post Graduate College Mardan and his LLB from the Muslim Law College in Islamabad.

References

1967 births
Living people
Pashtun people
Khyber Pakhtunkhwa MPAs 2013–2018
Awami National Party politicians
People from Mardan District